is a 2010 Japanese film directed by Hideyuki Hirayama, about the people in a small coal mining town in the Fukuoka Prefecture in southern Japan in 1955.

Cast
 Koyuki as Michiyo Tsujiuchi
 Takuya Ishida as Shinichi Nakaoka
 Sosuke Ikematsu as Mamoru Tsujiuchi
 Tokio Emoto as Yong-Nam Lee
 Ken Mitsuishi as Daisuke Nakaoka
 Jun Murakami as Norio Sudo
 Mie Nakao as Kuniko Watanabe
 Ittoku Kishibe as Shigeaki Lee
 Shinobu Otake as Hatsu Nakaoka

References

External links
 

2010 films
Films directed by Hideyuki Hirayama
2010s Japanese films